The 2016 Festival Luxembourgeois du cyclisme féminin Elsy Jacobs was the ninth edition of the Festival Luxembourgeois du cyclisme féminin Elsy Jacobs, a women's road racing event in Luxembourg. It was won by Polish cyclist Katarzyna Niewiadoma.

2016 in women's road cycling
Cyc
Women's road bicycle races
Cycle races in Luxembourg